Tashtypsky District (Khakas: , Tastıp aymağı) is an administrative and municipal district (raion), one of the eight in the Republic of Khakassia, Russia.  Its administrative center is the rural locality (a selo) of Tashtyp. Population:  The population of Tashtyp accounts for 38.7% of the district's total population.

Geography
The district is located in the south of the republic. Kyzlasov Peak, the highest point of Khakassia, is located in the southern border.

History
The town of Abaza used to be administratively under the jurisdiction of the district, but was elevated in status to the town of republican significance in 2003.

References

Notes

Sources



Districts of Khakassia